Phạm Tuấn Hải (born 19 May 1998) is a Vietnamese professional footballer who plays as a forward for V.League 1 club Hà Nội and the Vietnam national team.

Club career
Phạm Tuấn Hải began his senior career at Hồng Lĩnh Hà Tĩnh, where he made 73 official appearances and scored 29 goals across four seasons.

In December 2021, Hải returned to former club, Hanoi FC, on a three-year contract. On 12 March 2022, he made his first appearance in a home 0–0 draw against Ho Chi Minh City. On 7 April, he scored a brace in a 4–0 win over Cong an Nhan dan in Vietnamese Cup. He scored his first V.League 1 goal for Hanoi with a header against Saigon in a 3–1 home win on 20 July. End of the season, Tuấn Hải being involved in 29 games, scoring 13 goals.

International career
Phạm Tuấn Hải made his debut for the national team on 12 October 2021 in a 3–1 loss to Oman.

In December 2022, he was named in the 23-man squad for 2022 AFF Championship, making his first appearance in the competition by playing 13 minutes in the 6–0 group stage victory against Laos.

Career statistics

Club

International

International goals
Scores and results list Vietnam's goal tally first, score column indicates score after each Tuấn Hải goal.

Honours
Hồng Lĩnh Hà Tĩnh
V.League 2: 2019

Hà Nội
V.League 1: 2022
Vietnamese National Cup: 2022

Vietnam
VFF Cup: 2022

Individual
V.League 1 Player of the Month: October 2022
V.League 1 Goal of the Month: October 2022
V.League 1 Squad of the season: 2022
V.League 1 Goal of the season: 2022

References

External links

1998 births
Living people
Vietnamese footballers
Vietnam international footballers
Association football forwards
V.League 1 players
Hanoi FC players
People from Hà Nam Province